Hills Creek is a tributary, about  long, of the Middle Fork Willamette River in the U.S. state of Oregon. From its headwaters on Juniper Ridge in the Cascade Range, the creek flows northwest through Lane County and the Willamette National Forest for its entire course.

Forest Road 23 (Hills Creek Road) runs roughly parallel to the creek for most of its length.

Hills Creek was named for John J. Hill, who settled near the mouth of the creek in 1870. The dam and lake take their names from the creek.

Recreation
The lower  of the creek are stocked with rainbow trout that reach  in length. The stream also supports wild coastal cutthroat trout.

Whitewater enthusiasts sometimes run a  stretch of the creek that has been called "one of the more demanding creeks in the Eugene area". Rapids vary from class 4 to 5 on the International Scale of River Difficulty. Debris from logging adds to the many dangers on this run.

See also
 List of rivers of Oregon

References

External links
 Middle Fork Willamette Watershed Council

Rivers of Lane County, Oregon
Rivers of Oregon